Sir Henry Green, JP ( 1347 – 1399) was a courtier and councillor to king Richard II of England.

Ancestry
Born in Northamptonshire, he was the son of Sir Henry Green, a lawyer and Chief Justice of the Common Pleas, by his second marriage to Katherine Drayton, daughter of Sir John Drayton of Drayton.

Career

Green inherited Drayton House in Northamptonshire at his father's death in 1370. He became a JP in 1380 and MP for Huntingdonshire in 1390, for Northamptonshire in 1394 and 1397 and finally in the autumn of 1397 he became MP for Wiltshire. He also served in France with John of Gaunt.

He became a close confidant of King Richard II. Along with Sir John Bussy and Sir William Bagot he was appointed one of the eccentric Richard's 'continual councillors' who gained an unsavoury reputation. At one point they advised the king to confiscate the lands of the exiled Henry Bolingbroke, Duke of Hereford.

When Bolingbroke returned from exile in 1399 to reclaim his inheritance, the three councillors decided flight was the best option. Bussy and Green sought sanctuary in Bristol Castle but were delivered up to Bolingbroke on 28 July 1399, who had them beheaded the following day. Bagot was spared and eventually pardoned.

All three continual councillors (referred to as "caterpillars") feature in Shakespeare's historical play King Richard II, generally listed as "Bushy, Baghot and Green". Green also appears in the anonymous Elizabethan play Thomas of Woodstock.

Family

He married Maud (or Matilda) Mauduit, daughter and heiress of Thomas Mauduit, by whom he had several children, including;

 Ralph, his heir
 Eleanor, m. Sir John Fitzwilliam (d. 5 July 1417).

Notes

References

Greater Medieval Houses of England and Wales, 1300–1500
American Historical Society. 1n. History, genealogical-biographical, of the Danielson and allied families
Willement’s roll of arms

Date of birth unknown
Year of birth uncertain
1340s births
1399 deaths
Male Shakespearean characters
English MPs January 1390
Executed people from Northamptonshire
People executed under the Plantagenets by decapitation
English politicians convicted of crimes
English MPs 1394
English MPs January 1397
English MPs September 1397
English justices of the peace